Falah Dabsha Al Majidi  is a Kuwaiti football goalkeeper who played for Kuwait in the 1996 Asian Cup. He also competed in the men's tournament at the 1992 Summer Olympics.

References

External links
 
 

1970 births
Living people
Association football goalkeepers
Kuwaiti footballers
Kuwait international footballers
1996 AFC Asian Cup players
2000 AFC Asian Cup players
Al-Arabi SC (Kuwait) players
Olympic footballers of Kuwait
Footballers at the 1992 Summer Olympics
Asian Games bronze medalists for Kuwait
Asian Games medalists in football
Footballers at the 1994 Asian Games
Medalists at the 1994 Asian Games
Kuwait Premier League players
Al Jahra SC players
Khaitan SC players